L'Ancienne-Lorette is a city in central Quebec, Canada. It is a suburb of and an enclave within Quebec City.  It was merged with Quebec City on January 1, 2002 as part of a 2000–2006 municipal reorganization in Quebec, but, after a 2004 referendum, it was reconstituted as a separate city on January 1, 2006.

Its history dates to 1674, when a group of Huron (Wyandot) fleeing war with the Iroquois settled there under the protection of the French. It was founded as a mission village by the Jesuits. The Wyandot left after a few decades, and French settlers took over the land.

History
The Jesuit missionary Pierre Chaumonot in 1674 founded a settlement here when he built a chapel for the Huron (Wyandot). Following his third and final trip to the shrine of Loreto in Italy, Chaumonot was cured of a terrible headache. In gratitude, he placed the colony under the patronage of Our Lady of the Annunciation, but it is still commonly called Lorette.

In 1697, the Huron left the village in search of better land for hunting and fishing. Afterward the site became known in French as Vieille-Lorette ("Old Loreto") or Ancienne-Lorette ("Former Loreto"). A new location became known as Nouvelle-Lorette ("New Loreto") or Jeune-Lorette ("Young Loreto"). That site roughly corresponds to the Loretteville of today. A year later in 1698, the Parish of Notre-Dame-de-l'Annonciation was established.

In 1948, the place was incorporated as the village municipality of Notre-Dame-de-Lorette. In 1967, it gained town status and took back its original name, L'Ancienne-Lorette, to distinguish itself from the Notre-Dame-de-Lorette Lac-Saint-Jean region.

Until 1971, L'Ancienne-Lorette was the gateway to Quebec's International Airport. It used to be known as L'Ancienne-Lorette Airport. In 1971 the rural section of the town that included the airport was annexed by Sainte-Foy.

On January 1, 2002, L'Ancienne-Lorette was merged with Quebec City as part of a province-wide municipal reorganization and became part of the Laurentien borough of that city. After a 2004 referendum, it regained independent city status on January 1, 2006.

Demographics 

According to the Canada 2006 Census:
Population: 16,516
% Change (2001–2006): +3.7
Private dwellings occupied by usual residents: 7075 (total dwellings: 7183)
Area (km²): 7.63 km²
Density (persons per km²): 2,163.7
Mother tongue:
 English as first language: 1.5%
 French as first language: 97.4%
 English and French as first language: 0.2%
 Other as first language: 0.9%

Population trend:
 Population in 2011: 16745 (2006 to 2011 population change: 1.4%)
 Population in 2006: 16,516
 Population in 2001: 15,929
 Population in 1996: 15,895
 Population in 1991: 15,242

In 2006, L'Ancienne-Lorette was 98.9% White, 0.3% Aboriginal, and 0.8% Visible Minorities.

Economy
Quebecair Express, prior to its disestablishment, had its headquarters in the city.

Notable people born in L'Ancienne-Lorette
 Félix Auger-Aliassime (raised in L'Ancienne-Lorette), Canadian professional tennis player, junior singles and doubles US Open champion
 Patrice Bergeron, NHL hockey centre for the Boston Bruins
 Mario Marois, NHL defenceman, principally for the Quebec Nordiques
 Antoine Plamondon (ca. 1804-1895), artist
 Évelyne Viens, Olympic gold medal winning soccer player

See also
 Huron-Wendat Nation
 Wendake, Quebec

References

External links

 L'Ancienne-Lorette in L'Encyclopédie de l'agora (fr)

Cities and towns in Quebec
Incorporated places in Capitale-Nationale
Catholic missions of New France